Bradley Dub Bryant (born December 11, 1954) is an American professional golfer.

Bryant was born in Amarillo, Texas, the son of a Southern Baptist pastor. He moved with his family to Alamogordo, New Mexico during his youth. Bryant attended the University of New Mexico for three years, but turned professional and qualified for the PGA Tour in 1976, a year before his scheduled graduation.

Bryant's only win on the PGA Tour came at the age of forty at the 1995 Walt Disney World/Oldsmobile Classic, which took 20 years and 475 starts to achieve, one of the longest waits for a PGA Tour win. After reaching the age of 50, Bryant began play on the Champions Tour, where he won for the first time at the 2006 Toshiba Classic and followed up later the same year by winning the Regions Charity Classic. He lost to Jay Haas in a playoff for the 2006 Senior PGA Championship. His best year in professional golf was 2007, when he finished third on the Champions Tour money list and fourth in the Charles Schwab Cup race; that year was highlighted by his victory at the U.S. Senior Open.

Bryant's younger brother Bart also won on the PGA Tour.

Professional wins (6)

PGA Tour wins (1)

*Note: The 1995 Walt Disney World/Oldsmobile Classic was shortened to 54 holes due to rain.

PGA Tour playoff record (0–1)

Other wins (1)

Other playoff record (1–0)

Champions Tour wins (4)

Champions Tour playoff record (1–3)

Results in major championships

CUT = missed the half-way cut
"T" = tied

Results in The Players Championship

CUT = missed the halfway cut
"T" indicates a tie for a place

Senior major championships

Wins (1)

Results timeline
Results not in chronological order before 2021.

CUT = missed the halfway cut
WD = withdrew
"T" indicates a tie for a place
NT = No tournament due to COVID-19 pandemic

See also
Spring 1978 PGA Tour Qualifying School graduates
1987 PGA Tour Qualifying School graduates
1988 PGA Tour Qualifying School graduates

References

External links

Brad Bryant's religious testimony from TheGoal

American male golfers
New Mexico Lobos men's golfers
PGA Tour golfers
PGA Tour Champions golfers
Winners of senior major golf championships
Golfers from Texas
Sportspeople from Amarillo, Texas
Sportspeople from Lakeland, Florida
1954 births
Living people